The Norway national rugby league team was founded in 2008. Rugby League in Norway is played through junior and amateur level. There is a small seven-team premier competition and several development cups. They are recognized by the Norwegian Rugby Federation and the Rugby League International Federation as having affiliate status.

History
In February 2008, Norway was granted official observer status by the Rugby League European Federation despite being unranked at that point. This was not the only major point of development in the year, as a committee was formed, based in capital city Oslo, with the aim of developing the game all over the country.

As of 2019 the committee is under The Norwegian Rugby Federation.

Current squad
Bendik Kalvik (Bodø Barbarians)
Harald Mikalsen, Kristoffer Milligan (Flekkefjord Tigers)
Sonny Mellor, Joshua William Skidmore-Hornby (Lillestrøm Lions)
Isaac Schmidt (Oslo Capitals)
Kevin Båtnes 
Nils Kristian Holte
Chris Stalsberg (Porsgrunn Pirates) 
Kristian Hilton (Saddleworth Rangers) 
Kim Andre Seglem (Sandnes Raiders) 
Kristoffer Borsheim, Nathan Cummins, Ezra McIntyre, Fredrik Nortun (Stavanger Storm) 
Stephen Mwikaria, Ole Magnus Brekk, Frank Kiriinya, Simon Viljoen (Trondheim Rugby Klubb) 
Kristian Nordin-Skipnes (Woden Valley Rams)
Dan Horne (Sandnes Raiders/Newcastle University)

Rugby League Norway history
In 2009, Rugby League Norway – now The Norwegian Rugby Federation – Rugby League, was formed as an opportunity for a national competition was seen. Warren Heilig used this opportunity to develop a new sport in Norway.

Rugby League clubs in Norway -
Flekkefjord Tigers 
Bardufoss Badgers
Sandnes Raiders 
Stavanger Storm
Porsgrunn Pirates 
Lillestrøm Lions
Oslo Capitals 
Trondheim RK
Bodø Barbarians
Sparbu Lumberjacks
Haugesund Seaeagles

All-time Results Record

Results

Competitions
Norway's maiden Rugby League event was the "Scandinavia Cup", which was held in Oslo, Norway between 30 and 31 May 2009  and played under 9's rules.  Norway played Great Britain Pioneers in their first representative match on 5 July 2009 in Oslo which the visitors won 24–0.  Norway played their first international on 22 August 2009, against Denmark in Copenhagen and won 28–26.

See also

References

External links
Rugby League Planet
RLEF

National rugby league teams
Rugby League
Rugby league in Norway